The striated worm-lizard (Aprasia striolata) is a species of lizard in the family Pygopodidae. It is endemic to southern Australia (southern Western Australia, South Australia, and western Victoria).

References

Aprasia
Pygopodids of Australia
Endemic fauna of Australia
Reptiles of Western Australia
Reptiles of South Australia
Reptiles of Victoria (Australia)
Reptiles described in 1863
Taxa named by Christian Frederik Lütken